The Canterbury Martyrs were 16th-century English Protestant martyrs. They were executed for heresy in Canterbury, Kent, and were the last Protestants burnt during the reign of Mary I. Their story is recorded in Foxe's Book of Martyrs.

1555 
On 12 July 1555, John Bland (rector of Adesham), John Frankesh (vicar of Rolvindon), Nicholas Sheterden  and Humphrey Middleton were all burnt together. According to Foxe, they resigned themselves with Christian fortitude, fervently praying that God would receive them into his heavenly kingdom.

On 23 August, William Coker, William Hopper, Henry Laurence, Richard Collier (or Colliar), Richard Wright and William Stere were burnt.

On 6 September, George Catmer (or Painter) of Hythe, Kent, Robert Streater (or Streter) of Hythe, Kent, Anthony Burward of Calete (possibly Calais), George Brodbridge (or Bradbridge) of Bromfield, Kent and James Tutty (or Tuttey) of Brenchley, Kent were burnt.

On 30 November, John Webbe (or Web), George Roper and Gregory Parke (or Paynter) were burnt.

1556
On 31 January 1556, John Lomas (or Jhon Lowmas) of Tenterden, Kent, Agnes Snoth (or Annis Snod) of Smarden, Kent, Anne Wright (or Albright) alias Champnes, Joan Sole (or Jone Soale) of Horton, Kent and Joan Catmer of Hythe, Kent were viciously and savagely burned alive at the stake in Wincheap, Canterbury. A monument marks the spot on the road now called 'Martyrs Field Road'.

1557
On 15 January 1557, Stephen Kempe of Norgate/ Northgate, Canterbury, William Waterer of Biddenden, Kent, William Prowting of Thornham, Kent, William Lowick of Cranbrooke, Kent, Thomas Hudson of Selling, Kent and William Hay of Hythe, Kent were burnt.

On 19 June, John Fishcock/Jhon Fiscoke, Nicholas White, Nicholas Pardue/Perdue, Barbara Final, Bradbridge's Widow (Bradbridge's Wife), probably of Tenterden, Kent and probably the widow of Martin Bradbridge who was burnt on 16 January 1557, Mistress Wilson (also referred to as 'Wilson's Wife') and  Alice Benden, possibly also referred to as 'Benson's Wife', of Staplehurst (or possibly Cranbrook), Kent were burnt.

1558
On 15 November 1558, John Corneford of Wrotham, Kent, Christopher Brown of Maidstone, Kent, John Herst of Ashford, Kent, Alice Snoth and Katherine Knight/Tynley were burnt.

See also
 List of Protestant martyrs of the English Reformation

References

Groups of Christian martyrs of the Early Modern era
People executed under Mary I of England
1555 deaths
16th-century Protestant martyrs
People executed for heresy
People from Canterbury
16th-century English people
Year of birth unknown
Executed English people
People executed by the Kingdom of England by burning
Protestant martyrs of England